Brian Tarquin  (born December 2, 1965, New York) is an American jazz guitarist, recording artist, sound engineer, record producer,  composer, and author who founded Jungle Room Studios in New York. He specializes in guitar instrumental music and smooth jazz. He records for several labels, including his own launched in 2006, BHP Music/Guitar Trax, specializing in music for guitar.  Throughout his career he has recorded with and produced projects with Larry Coryell, Gary Hoey, Hal Lindes, Chuck Loeb, Steve Morse, Billy Sheehan, Ron "Bumblefoot" Thal, Leslie West, and Mike Stern.

Early life and education 
Tarquin studied at Mannes School of Music (New York), The State University of New York (New Paltz) and Center for the Media Arts (New York).

Professional career

Composer
Tarquin wrote the theme music for MTV's Road Rules, All My Children, and The Watcher. He received two Television Academy Emmy Awards for his work on All My Children, and additional nominations.

He has provided musical scores for the films A Bird of the Air, Real Steel, Inferno, and Bart Got a Room; as well as scoring for television in episodes of 24, Alias, America's Next Top Model, Beverly Hills, 90210, Cheers, CSI: Crime Scene Investigation, Extra, Friends, Grey's Anatomy, ABC's Making The Band, Malcolm in the Middle, Melrose Place, Seinfeld, The Simpsons, TMZ on TV, and Sex and the City.

Producer and recording engineer 
Tarquin produced the Guitar Masters Series from the Jungle Room Studios, which featured guitarists Jeff Beck, Steve Vai, Jimmy Page, Steve Morse, Gary Hoey, Santana, Billy Sheehan, BB King, Frank Gambale, Leslie West, Chris Poland, Hal Lindes, and Joe Satriani.  

In 2006 Tarquin launched his own record label, BHP Music/Guitar Trax, and released personal projects and a series of Guitar Masters compilations.

In 2012 he founded TV Film Trax, a music production catalog which by 2016 included more than 2,000 songs by a variety of composers for television, and from which editors, music supervisors, producers, or directors can easily access tracks for their productions.

Guitarist and performer

Smooth Jazz 

In 1995 Tarquin entered into a recording deal with the MCA-distributed Jazz Inspiration label, and the following year he released a debut smooth jazz album entitled Ghost Dance. He was later engaged by Instinct Records and released three albums, Last Kiss Goodbye, Soft Touch, and High Life. In 2002 he released Sanctuary on the Passion Jazz label. In 2005, with Chris Ingram, he released a recording of electronic music for use in stage and screen called Downtempo Drama Vol. 1 on the Megatrax Production Music Inc. label.  In 2008, Tarquin released Fretwork for nuGroove Records.

Asphalt Jungle 

In the early 2000s, Tarquin founded the band Asphalt Jungle with keyboardist and programmer Chris Ingram, and in 2002 released Electro Ave., followed by Enjoy This Trip, Jungilzation, Bob Marley Remixed, and Crazy Train. The track "Witchcraft", from Asphalt Jungle's 2002 album Electro Ave., became the theme song to MTV's 1998 season of Road Rules.

Recent projects 
In the 2010s, Tarquin worked on charitable projects including releases Brian Tarquin & Heavy Friends: Guitars For Wounded Warriors (with Billy Sheehan, Bumblefoot, Reb Beach, Chris Poland, Gary Hoey, The Flyin' Ryan Brothers, Alex DeRosso, Hal Lindes, Chuck Loeb, and Steve Morse) and Orlando In Heaven (with Larry Coryell, Phil Naro, Bobby Baldwin, Chris Poland, Mike Stern, Denny Jiosa, Will Ray, Tony Franklin, and Hal Lindes), both on Purple Pyramid Records.

Publications and radio

Books 
 Recording Techniques of the Guitar Masters
 The Insider's Guide to Music Licensing
The Insider's Guide to Home Recording'
 Guitar Amplifier Encyclopedia
 Guitar Encyclopedia
 Stomp on This! The Guitar Pedal Effects Guidebook
 Survival Guide For Music Composers: Tools of the Trade to Get Paid!

Magazine columns 
In 2017-2018 Tarquin wrote a series of recording studio articles for Guitar Player magazine. In 2010 he was a regular contributor to Recording Magazine, and in 2007 he wrote a monthly column called "Guitar Studio" for Premier Guitar Magazine. The column focused on studio techniques for musicians and recording engineers. Tarquin also conducted interviews of musicians for the magazine.

Radio show 
Tarquin hosts a weekly show called Guitar Trax on NPR's WFIT 89.5FM (Florida). The show debuted on Jan 11, 2016 and focusses on jazz and electric fusion styles such as Weather Report, Pat Metheny, Mahavishnu Orchestra, Billy Cobham, Jeff Beck and Frank Zappa.

Discography

Awards and nominations 
Wins

 2018 USA Best Book Awards Performing Arts Winner for Survival Guide for Music Composers:  Tools of the Trade to Get Paid!
2014 USA Best Book Awards Performing Arts Winner for Guitar Encyclopedia
2005 National Academy of Television Arts & Sciences Emmy Award Winner for Outstanding Achievement in Music Direction and Composition for a Drama Series for All My Children (shared with Terry Walker, Jerry Pilato, A.J. Gundell, Dominic Messinger, R. C. Cates, John Wineglass, Brian Comotto, Loris Holland, Gary Kuo, Kim Oler, Peter Fish, Tom Spahn, and Jim Klein)
2003 National Academy of Television Arts & Sciences Emmy Award Winner for Outstanding Achievement in Music Direction and Composition for a Drama Series for All My Children (shared with Terry Walker, Andrew J. Gundell, Jerry Pilato, Dominic Messinger, Mike Renzi, John Wineglass, Brian Comotto, Loris Holland, Robbie Kondor, Ron Goodman, Gary Kuo, Kim Oler, Peter Fish, and Jim Klein)

Nominations
 2018 Independent Music Awards Nomination for Best Album - Compilation for Guitars for Veterans as Brian Tarquin & Heavy Friends Deux
2017 Independent Music Awards Nomination for Best Album - Compilation for Orlando in Heaven as Brian Tarquin & Company
2016 Independent Music Awards Nomination for Best Album - Compilation for Guitars for Wounded Warriors as Brian Tarquin & Heavy Friends
2009 National Academy of Television Arts & Sciences Emmy Award Nomination for Outstanding Achievement in Music Direction and Composition for a Drama Series for All My Children
2004 National Academy of Television Arts & Sciences Emmy Award Nomination for Outstanding Achievement in Music Direction and Composition for a Drama Series for All My Children (shared with Terry Walker, A.J. Gundell, Jerry Pilato, John Wineglass, Brian Comotto, Loris Holland, Gary Kuo, Kim Oler, Peter Fish, Tom Spahn, and Jim Klein)

Charts

References

External links 
 Conversation with Brian Tarquin (video interview)
 Interview "I thought this was a great thing to get all of us together and record some great music."w

Living people
Guitarists from New York City
1965 births
American male guitarists
20th-century American guitarists
20th-century American male musicians